"Give Me a Ring Sometime" is a song written by Sharon Anderson, Kris Bergsnes, and Bob Moulds. It was recorded by Canadian country music singer Lisa Brokop for her 1994 album, Every Little Girl's Dream, from which it was issued as the album's first single. The song became a top twenty hit on the Canadian RPM Country Tracks.

The song's co-writer, Sharon Anderson, recorded her own version of the song, as "Gimme a Ring Sometime," in 1995. Anderson's version is found on her second album, Bringing It Home.

While the song failed to reach the top 40 in the United States, Brokop received a nomination for Top New Female Vocalist at the 1995 Academy of Country Music awards.

Chart performance
The song debuted at number 86 on the Canadian RPM Country Tracks on the chart dated July 18, 1994 and spent nine weeks on the chart before peaking at number 12 on September 12, 1994.

References

1994 songs
1994 singles
Lisa Brokop songs
Liberty Records singles
Song recordings produced by Jerry Crutchfield
Songs written by Sharon Anderson (singer)
Songs written by Bob Mould